The 1927 Cal Aggies football team represented the Northern Branch of the College of Agriculture—now known as the University of California, Davis—as a member of the Far Western Conference (FWC) during the 1927 college football season. The team was known as the Cal Aggies, California Aggies, and sometimes the Cal Aggies Mustangs. Led by William L. Driver in his fifth and final season as head coach, the Cal Aggies compiled an overall record of 4–3–1 with a mark of 2–1 in conference play, tying for second place in the FWC. The team outscored its opponents 84 to 82 for the season with three of their victories coming via shutout. The Cal Aggies played one home game at Moreing Field in Sacramento, California and three home games in Davis, California

In five years under Driver, the Aggies compiled a record of 18–23–3, for a winning percentage of .443.

Schedule

References

Cal Aggies
UC Davis Aggies football seasons
Cal Aggies football